was the first of the Emperors of Northern Court during the Period of the Northern and Southern Courts in Japan. His reign spanned the years from 1331 through 1333.

Genealogy
Before his ascension to the Nanboku-chō throne, his personal name (his imina) was Kazuhito-shinnō (量仁親王).  He was the third son of Emperor Go-Fushimi of the Jimyōin line.  His mother was Kōgimon'in Neishi (広義門院寧子). He was adopted by his uncle, Emperor Hanazono. His family included:

Empress: Imperial Princess Yoshiko (懽子内親王) later Senseimon-in (宣政門院), Emperor Go-Daigo’s daughter
Second daughter: (b. 1335)
Third daughter: Imperial Princess Mitsuko (b. 1337; 光子内親王)
Consort: Imperial Princess Hisako (寿子内親王) later Kianmon-in (徽安門院), Emperor Hanazono’s daughter
Lady-in-waiting: Sanjō Shūshi (三条秀子) later Yōrokumon’in (陽禄門院), Ogimachi Sanjo Kinhide's daughter
First daughter: (b. 1333)
Princess
First son: Imperial Prince Okihito (興仁親王) later Emperor Sukō
Second son: Imperial Prince Iyahito (弥仁親王) later Emperor Go-Kōgon
Naishi: Ima-no-kata, Saionji Sanehira's daughter
Naishi: Dai-no-kata, Saionji Saneakira's daughter
Fourth Son: Imperial Prince Sonchō (1344–1378; 尊朝親道親王)
Princess
Naishi: Ichijo-no-tsubone, Ogimachi Kinkage's daughter
Imperial Prince Yoshihito (died 1415; 義仁親王)
Naishi: Oinomikado Fuyuuji's daughter
daughter: (1331–1402)
Unknown
Daughter: Hanarin Songen (d. 1386; 華林恵厳)

Events of Kōgon's life
In his own lifetime, Kōgon and those around him believed that he occupied the Chrysanthemum Throne from October 22, 1331 until July 7, 1333.  Kazuhito-shinnō was named Crown Prince and heir to Emperor Go-Daigo of the Daikakuji line in 1326. At this time in Japanese history, by decision of the Kamakura shogunate, the throne would alternate between the Daikakuji and Jimyōin lines every ten years.  However, Go-Daigo did not comply with this negotiated agreement.

In 1331, when Go-Daigo's second attempt to overthrow the shogunate became public, the Shogunate seized him, exiled him to the Oki Islands, and enthroned Kōgon on October 22. Emperor Go-Daigo used the 17-petal chrysanthemum emblem during his exile. He escaped Oki in 1333, with the help of Nawa Nagatoshi and his family, and raised an army at Funagami Mountain in Hōki Province (the modern town of Kotoura in Tōhaku District, Tottori Prefecture).  Meanwhile, Ashikaga Takauji (足利 尊氏), the chief general of the Hōjō family, turned against the Hōjō and fought for Emperor Go-Daigo in the hopes of being named shōgun. Takauji attacked Hōjō Nakatomi and Hōjō Tokimasu, the Rokuhara Tandai, or chiefs of the Kamakura shogunate in Kyoto. They both fled to the east, but were captured in Ōmi Province. On July 7, 1333, Go-Daigo seized the throne from Emperor Kōgon and attempted to re-established Imperial control in what is referred to as the Kenmu Restoration (1333–1336). Go-Daigo's attempt failed, however, after Ashikaga Takauji turned against him.

In 1336, Takauji installed Kōgon's younger brother on the throne as Emperor Kōmyō. Go-Daigo fled to Yoshino, in Yamato Province and continued to lay proper claim to the throne, establishing what would come to be known as the Southern Court. Kōmyō's court remained in Kyoto and would come to be known as the Northern Dynasty. This marked the beginning of the Northern and Southern Courts Period of Japanese history, which lasted until 1392.

In April 1352, taking advantage of a family feud in the Ashikaga clan known as the Kan'ō Disturbance, Emperor Go-Murakami of the Southern Court captured Kyōto, and carried away Emperor Kōgon, Emperor Kōmyō, Emperor Sukō, and the Crown Prince Tadahito.  They finally ended up in Anau, the location of the Southern Court.

Following this, Kōgon was held under house arrest for the remainder of his life. In his final years, he converted to Zen Buddhism, and died on August 5, 1364.

Eras of Kōgon's reign
The years of Kōgon's reign are more specifically identified by more than one era name or nengō.

Pre-Naboku-chō period
 Genkō (1331–1334)
 Kenmu                (1334–1336)

Naboku-chō Southern court
Eras as reckoned by legitimate Court (as determined by Meiji rescript)
 ...

Naboku-chō Northern court
Eras as reckoned by pretender Court (as determined by Meiji rescript)
 Shōkei (1332–1338)

Southern Court Rivals
 Emperor Go-Daigo

Ancestry

Notes

References

 Ponsonby-Fane, Richard Arthur Brabazon. (1959).  The Imperial House of Japan. Kyoto: Ponsonby Memorial Society. OCLC 194887
 Titsingh, Isaac, ed. (1834). [Siyun-sai Rin-siyo/Hayashi Gahō, 1652], Nipon o daï itsi ran; ou,  Annales des empereurs du Japon.  Paris: Oriental Translation Fund of Great Britain and Ireland.

See also
 Emperor of Japan
 List of Emperors of Japan
 Imperial cult
 Emperor Go-Kōgon

Japanese emperors
1313 births
1364 deaths
Emperor Kogon
Emperor Kogon
14th-century Japanese monarchs
Japanese Zen Buddhists